Boogie Pimps are an electronic music duo from Erfurt, Germany. It was formed by two DJs: Mark J Klak and Mirko Jacob.

History
Their collaboration started in 2000, when Mirko Jacob started performing in Klak's JoueJoueClub in Erfurt. Jacob has since left the group, and his place was filled by Australian-born Jon Henderson.

In Autumn 2003, Boogie Pimps released their first single, a remix of Jefferson Airplane's cover of The Great Society's "Somebody to Love". In January 2004, this song entered the top ten of the UK Singles Chart. The music video for "Somebody to Love" features several infants sky diving out of an aeroplane towards a giant woman (Natasha Mealey) lying on a grassy hill country landscape in her underwear, singing the song.

Their second single, "Sunny" is also a cover, originally recorded by Bobby Hebb.

In 2004, they appeared on a white label, which was not widely released, under the pseudonym 'Pimps Guerilla'. They performed songs such as "Right Out of Here" and "Make 'em Drop". While "Make 'em Drop" made it onto a few compilations, "Right Out of Here" is not commercially available, with the exception of white labels. This could be for legal reasons, as extracts of lyrics and melody were sampled from the end of Queen's "Bohemian Rhapsody".

Discography

Albums
 2012 - In Pimps We Trust - The Album

Singles
 2003 - "Somebody to Love" - #3 UK, BPI: Silver, #10 AUS
 2004 - "Sunny" - #10 UK, #23 AUS
 2006 - "The Music in Me"
 2007 - God's Pimp - The Electronic EP [on CD Pussy Lounge, Vol. 2]
 2007 - "Then Came You"
 2008 - "Gang Bang"
 2009 - The Fresh EP
 2009 - "Promised Land"
 2009 - "PeeBoy"
 2010 - "All Day and All of the Night"
 2011 - "Knocking" feat. Darryl Pandy
 2011 - Brown Paper EP
 2012 - "24Seven"

Remixes
 Julien Scalzo & Ron Carroll - It's You (Boogie Pimps Remix)  2018
 Murano meets Toka feat. Dumbstruke - Nachtleben (Boogie Pimps Remix)  2012
 Agent Greg & Terri B! Time Won't Wait - Boogie Pimps Club Mix & Soulful House Mix 2012
 Tom Wax + Alex Stadler 	Welcome Back - Boogie Pimps Remix - 2011
 Tujamo Mombasa - Boogie Pimps Remix - 2011
 Sebastian Krieg & StrobeTwist in my Sobriety - Boogie Pimps Remix - 2010
 Francesco Gomez	Primavera feat. Lety - Boogie Pimps Remix - 2010
 Kid Massive & Blacktron Turn it up - Boogie Pimps Remix - 2010
 Albin Myers + Dabruck & Klein	Loenneberga - Boogie Pimps Remix - 2010
 Peter Brown & Jonathan Ulysses No Friends - Boogie Pimps Remix - 2010
 Dirty Funker	Flat Beat - Boogie Pimps Remix - 2010
 Sharam (Deep Dish) feat. Kid Cudi She came along - Boogie Pimps Remix - 2009
 DBN	Jack is Back - Boogie Pimps Remix - 2009
 Tune Brothers	Finally 2009 - Boogie Pimps Remix - 2009
 Disco Dice Let's have a Party - Boogie Pimps Remix - 2009
 Rosenstolz Blaue Flecken - Boogie Pimps Remix - 2009
 Rosenstolz  Blaue Flecken - Boogie Pimps Dub Remix - 2009
 DJ P.i.P. Yostar - Boogie Pimps Remix - 2009
 Marshall Jefferson vs. Noosa Heads Mushrooms - Boogie Pimps Rmx- 2008
 Twisted Society vs. Bilingual Freaks Nasty Seven - Boogie Pimps Remix - 2008
 De Jeugd van Tegenwoordig Watskeburt - Boogie Pimps Rmx - 2007
 Diego Ray Afterlite - Boogie Pimps Rmx - 2007
 Rosenstolz Wir sind wir - Boogie Pimps Rmx - 2006
 Shibuku Crazy Situation - Boogie Pimps Rmx - 2006
 Milk & Sugar	What is Love - Boogie Pimps Rmx - 2005
 Villa & Gant Wind him up - Boogie Pimps Rmx - 2005
 Voodoo & Serano	Don't you know - Boogie Pimps Rmx - 2005
 Rosenstolz	Ich komm an Dir nicht weiter - Boogie Pimps Rmx - 2004
 KLF	Build a fire - Boogie Pimps Rmx - 2004
 Kay Cee The Truth - Boogie Pimps Rmx - 2003
 Wackside vs. Chic Le Freak - Boogie Pimps Rmx - 2003
 Mondo Grande	Mondo Grande - Boogie Pimps Rmx - 2003
 Jason Nevins I'm In Heaven - Boogie Pimps Rmx- 2003

References

External links
 Official Website
 Boogie Pimps at Discogs.com
 https://www.facebook.com/realboogiepimps
 https://www.youtube.com/realboogiepimps

German electronic music groups
German musical duos